Lu Weizhao (1920 – November 1, 2015) was a Chinese diplomat. He was born in Nantong, Jiangsu. He joined the Communist Party of China in 1941. He was Ambassador of the People's Republic of China to Pakistan (1974–1979), Syria (1979–1983) and Algeria (1983–1985).

1920 births
2015 deaths
Ambassadors of China to Pakistan
Ambassadors of China to Syria
Ambassadors of China to Algeria
People from Nantong